The 2005 KNVB Cup Final was a football match between Willem II and PSV on 29 May 2005 at De Kuip, Rotterdam. It was the final match of the 2004–05 KNVB Cup competition. PSV won 4–0 after goals from Wilfred Bouma, Phillip Cocu, Park Ji-sung and Jan Vennegoor of Hesselink. With this victory, PSV clinched the double, as they had also become champions of the 2004–05 Eredivisie. This was PSV's first double since the 1988–89 season.

Route to the final

Match

Details

References

2005
2004–05 in Dutch football
PSV Eindhoven matches
Willem II (football club) matches
May 2005 sports events in Europe
21st century in Rotterdam